Chaudhry Muhammad Ashfaq  is a Pakistani politician of Pakistan Peoples Party, he was elected as a member of the National Assembly of Pakistan and Provincial Assembly of the Punjab. Pakistani industrialist Mian Muhammad Latif, the founder of Chenab Group is his brother.

References

Living people
Pakistan People's Party politicians
Year of birth missing (living people)